Tanis Chandler (born Tannis Anne Goldthwaite; August 29, 1924 – May 7, 2006) was a French-born American film actress. She was perhaps best known for masquerading as a male to gain a role in a film.

Early years
Chandler was born in Nantes, France. Her father was musician Chandler Goldthwaite, who was billed as Rex Chandler for his performances of popular music. Her mother was Leon Lorfray De Rousier. Chandler was educated initially by private tutors in Paris and, after the family moved to the United States in 1936, at the Westlake School for Girls in Los Angeles. After her father's illness interrupted his work on radio programs, she became a model to help with finances.

Acting 
In 1940, Chandler acted in a production of Prison Without Bars at the Troupers theater. Her film debut came in Devotion (1943), and she appeared in Cinderella Jones (1946), George White's Scandals and Wanderer of the Wasteland. She also used her fluency in French and Spanish to dub parts for foreign versions of approximately 30 films.

Chandler pulled off a hoax on film executives when she obtained a part in The Desert Song (1943) by pretending to be a male, Robert Archer. A wire-service news story distributed nationwide explained, "She was aided in the deception by the fact that she and most of the other players were clad in flowing robes and burnooses ..." Her success was such that the casting office sent Archer for work in another film, My Reputation (1946). That venture ended, however, when a scene called for being shirtless while mowing a lawn. At that point, Chandler admitted to being a female, ending her male-impersonation efforts. Her explanation for the hoax was that studio executives frequently complained about a lack of men, and she hoped for a better opportunity for roles in films.

Described as an "up-and-coming Hollywood starlet", Chandler was featured on the cover of Parade magazine's April 7, 1946, issue.

Other work 
Chandler worked for a stock brokerage firm for a year, and she and her mother operated a kindergarten in which she taught when she was not working in films.

Personal life
In October 1949, Chandler married Paul Mills. She died in May 2006 at the age of 81.

Filmography

References

External links

 

1924 births
2006 deaths
20th-century American actresses
American film actresses
French emigrants to the United States
21st-century American women